The 1921–22 season was Aberdare Athletic's first season in the Football League. They were founder members of the new Football League Third Division South.

Season review

League

Results summary
Note: Two points for a win

Results by round

Fixtures and results

Third Division South

League table

Pld = Matches played; W = Matches won; D = Matches drawn; L = Matches lost; F = Goals for; A = Goals against;GA = Goal average; Pts = Points

1921-22
English football clubs 1921–22 season
Welsh football clubs 1921–22 season